Taiwan–Turkey relations are the foreign relations between Taiwan and Turkey. Since 1971, Turkey maintains non-governmental, working-level relations with Taiwan.

Diplomatic relations

Ottoman relations with China and Japanese colonial rule over Taiwan

From 1683 to 1895, Great Qing governed Taiwan as part of Fujian but generally sent Great Qing’s worst to Taiwan that led to oppressive rule and violence. Great Qing  ceded Taiwan in the 1895 Treaty of Shimonoseki, which Turkey recognized.

Republic of China

After the collapse of the Qing dynasty in 1911, the Ottoman Empire and later the Republic of Turkey established relations with the Republic of China in 1934.

Turkish government officials received a Chinese Muslim delegation under Wang Zengshan who denounced the Japanese invasion of China.

Following Japan's defeat in World War II, Taiwan became part of the Republic of China on October 25, 1945. Between 1947 and 1949, Mao’s armies defeated Chiang Kai-shek’s Nationalist Chinese forces, which caused the government and the military of the Republic of China to flee to Taiwan. The ROC went on to reconstruct the island, following the land reform effort launched in 1950. 

In 1968, a period of Sino-American rapprochement occurred because Richard Nixon needed Chinese help in getting out of the Vietnam War “with honor.” Following this rapprochement, Turkey was one of 76 nations voting in favor of admitting Mao's government to the United Nations, in place of Chiang Kai-shek’s. Afterwards Turkey quickly moved on to establish diplomatic relations People’s Republic of China, thereby suspending diplomatic relations with the Republic of China. Despite adhering  to the PRC's One-China policy, Turkey still maintains unofficial relations with Taiwan.

In October 31 2020, Recep Tayyip Erdogan, the President of Turkey, posted a tweet thanking Taiwan for giving Turkey aid to get through an earthquake it recently got struck by, but took it down and replaced it with one where the thanks was gone. Many Taiwanese officials expressed their displeasure with the tweet. Joseph Wu, Taiwan's Minister of Foreign Affairs, said it was due to China's meddling and pressure.

Economic relations 

 Trade volume between the two countries was US$1.4 billion in 2017 (Turkish exports/imports: 0.2/1.2 billion USD).
 There are direct flights from Istanbul to Taipei since March 2015.

Further reading  
 Aspalter, Christian. Understanding Modern Taiwan: Essays in Economics, Politics, and Social Policy. Burlington, VT: Ashgate, 2003. 
 Chaffee, Frederic H. Area Handbook for the Republic of China. Washington, DC: U.S. Government Printing Office, 1983. 
 Chang, Cecilia, ed. The Republic of China on Taiwan, 1949–1988. New York: St. John's University Press, 1991. 
 Chien, Frederick F. Opportunity and Challenge. Tempe: Arizona Historical Foundation, Arizona State University, 1995. 
 Clough, Ralph N. Island China. Cambridge, MA: Harvard University Press, 1978. 
 Cohen, Marc J. Taiwan at the Crossroads: Human Rights, Political Development and Social Change on the Beautiful Island. Washington, DC: Asia Resource Center, 1988. 
 Copper, John F. Taiwan: Nation-State or Province? 4th ed. Boulder, CO: Westview Press, 2003. 
 Edmonds, L. G. Taiwan—the Other China. New York: Bobbs-Merrill, 1971. 
 Furuya, Keiji. Chiang Kai-Shek: His Life and Times. New York: St. John's University Press, 1981. 
 Gates, Hill. Chinese Working-Class Lives: Getting By in Taiwan. Ithaca, NY: Cornell University Press, 1987. 
 Han, Lih-wu. Taiwan Today. Taipei: Institute of International Relations, 1974. 
 Hsiung, James, ed. Contemporary Republic of China: The Taiwan Experience, 1950–1980. New York: Praeger, 1981.
 Hsiung, James, ed. The Taiwan Experience, 1950–1980. New York: American Association for Chinese Studies, 1981. 
 Hung Chien-chao. A History of Taiwan. Rimini, Italy: Il Cerchio, 2000.  Jo, Yung-hwan, ed. Taiwan's Future. Tempe: Arizona State University, 1974. 
 Kubek, Anthony. Modernizing China: A Comparative Analysis of the Two Chinas. Washington, DC: Regency Gateway, 1987. 
 Lee, Wei-chin. Taiwan in Perspective. Boston: Brill, 2000. 
 Li, Victor C., ed. The Future of Taiwan: A Difference of Opinion. Armonk, NY: M. E. Sharpe, 1980.
  Li, Xiaobing, and Zuohong Pan. Taiwan in the Twenty-first Century. Lanham, MD: University Press of America, 2003. 
 Liu, Alan P. L. Phoenix and the Lame Lion. Stanford, CA: Hoover Institution Press, 1987. 
 The Republic of China on Taiwan Today: Views from Abroad. Taipei: Kwang Hwa Publishing Company, 1989. 
 Sutter, Robert G. Taiwan: Entering the 21st Century. Lanham, MD: University Press of America, 1988. 
 Taiwan 2005 Yearbook. Taipei: Government Information Office, 2005.

See also 

 Foreign relations of Taiwan
 Foreign relations of Turkey

References 

Taiwan–Turkey relations
Turkey
Bilateral relations of Turkey